Bilbul is a village in the Australian state of New South Wales.  It lies in the central part of the Riverina and situated about 6 kilometres north-east of Griffith and 6 kilometres south-west of Yenda. Bilbul was named in honor of William T Bull, an early landowner from the 1880s. The William Bull Brewery is located at Bilbul and named after William Bull, and thus indirectly also after Bilbul. The town had a population at the  census of 672 people.

The head office of De Bortoli Wines, the makers of wine brands such as Noble One, a Botrytis Semillon, is at Bilbul.

Bilbul Post Office opened on 6 November 1922.

Bilbul Public School was closed down in October 2011 after enrolments fell to an all-time low. After over 80 years of operation, Bilbul lost its general store on March 31, 2017.

References

External links
De Bortoli Wines homepage

Towns in the Riverina